Prairie restoration is a conservation effort to restore prairie lands that were destroyed due to industrial, agricultural, commercial, or residential development. The primary aim is to return areas and ecosystems to their previous state before their depletion.

In the United States, after the Black Hawk War had subsided in the mid-1830s, settlers from northern Europe and north east of the US made a home for themselves. They plowed up the tallgrasses and wild flowers in the area. By 1849 most specie of prairie grass had disappeared to make room for crops (i.e.: soybeans, corn, etc.). Restored prairies and the grasses that survived the 1800 plowing represent only a fragment of the abundant verdure that once covered he midsection of North America from western Ohio to the Rockies and from southern Canada to Texas. As an example, the U.S. state of Illinois alone once held over 35,000 square miles (91,000 km2) of prairie land and now just 3 square miles (7.8 km2) of that original prairie land is left. The over farming of this land as well as periods of drought and its exposure to the elements (no longer bound together by the tall grasses) was responsible for the Dust Bowls in the 1930s.

Issues of erosion, and waning biodiversity have arisen in areas once populated by prairie grass species. So in efforts of restoration, in Europe, when restoring previous crop land with prairie grasses, the most frequently used techniques involve: spontaneous succession, sowing seed mixtures, transfer of plant material, topsoil removal and transfer.

Although not fully able to restore the full diversity of an area, restoration efforts aid the thriving of the natural ecosystems. This is further improved by the specific reintroduction of key organisms from the native plants microbiome. Prairie soil also effectively stores carbon. As carbon sinks, they work as a vital regulator of carbon in the atmosphere through carbon sequestration (withdrawal), and the carbon benefits the sustenance of diverse species in the prairie ecosystem.

Purpose

Erosion 
Erosion occurs when surface pressures wear away the material of the Earth’s crust. Particularly with land previously dominated by prairie grasses, the loss of the tallgrass extensive fibrous root system left the soil exposed and unbound.  Ecologically, prairie restoration aids in conservation of earth's topsoil, which is often exposed to erosion from wind and rain (worsened by climate change's heavier and frequent rain) when prairies are plowed under to make way for new commerce. Conversely, much more of the prairie lands have become the fertile fields on which cereal crops of corn, barley and wheat are grown. Continued erosion reduces the long term productivity of the soil.

Prairie restoration reintroduces this root system that once again binds the soil, strengthening it against water erosion through adequate water filtration.

Carbon Collection 
Prairie soil is also useful for carbon sequestration. Carbon dioxide is a heat trapping gas, and 40% of it is produced by humans and remains in the atmosphere thus worsening the effects of global warming. Prairie grass collects this carbon from the atmosphere through photosynthesis and stores it in its soil. When left undisturbed, the prairie soil acts as a Carbon sink, meaning it absorbs more carbon from the atmosphere than it releases.

Other Purposes 
Many prairie plants are also highly resistant to drought, temperature extremes, disease, and native insect pests. They are frequently used for xeriscaping projects in arid regions of the American West.

A restoration project of prairie lands can be large or small. A backyard prairie restoration will enrich soil, help with erosion and take up extra water in excessive rainfalls. Prairie flowers are attractive to native butterflies and other pollinators. On a larger scale, communities and corporations are creating areas of restored prairies which in turn will store organic carbon in the soil and help maintain the biodiversity of the 3000 plus species that count on the grasslands for food and shelter.

Types of plants
Some prominent tallgrass prairie grasses include big bluestem, indiangrass, and switchgrass. Midgrass and shortgrass species include little bluestem, side oats grama, and buffalograss. Many of the diverse prairie forbs (herbaceous, non-graminoid flowering plants) are structurally specialized to resist herbaceous grazers such as American bison. Some have hairy leaves that may help deter the cold and prevent excessive evaporation. Many of forbs contain secondary compounds that were discovered by indigenous peoples and are still used widely today. For example, purple coneflower (Echinacea purpurea or just Echinacea) is used as an herbal remedy for colds.

Early prairie restoration efforts tended to focus largely on a few dominant species, typically grasses, with little attention to seed source. With experience, later restorers have realized the importance of obtaining a broad mix of species and using local ecotype seed.

Planting and Aftercare of Prairie Plants
In Europe, when restoring previous crop land with prairie grasses, the most frequently used techniques involve: spontaneous succession, sowing seed mixtures, transfer of plant material, topsoil removal and transfer. Spontaneous succession is an effective technique when quick results are not expected and where there is high availability of propagules. Sowing mixtures can be low or high diversity, referring to the variety of seeds. Low diversity mixtures are great for restoring large areas in a short amount of time. High diversity mixtures (because of their cost and success rate) are used for smaller areas. A mixture of large low diversity areas and small high diversity areas are good rich source patches for the spontaneous colonization of neighboring areas. This allows for the possibility of continued natural restoration.

Fire is a big component to the success of grasslands, large or small as it is a fire dependent ecosystem. Controlled burns, with a permit, are recommended every 4–8 years (after two growth seasons) to burn away dead plants; prevent certain other plants from encroaching (such as trees) and release and recycling nutrients into the ground to encourage new growth. A much more wildlife habitat friendly alternative to burning every 4–8 years is to burn 1/4 to 1/8 of a tract every year. This will leave wildlife a home every year and still accomplish the task of burning. The Native Americans may also have used the burns to control pests such as ticks. These prescribed burn motivate grasses to grow taller, produce more seed, and flower more abundantly.  If controlled burns are not possible, rotational mowing is recommended as a substitute.

One of the newer methods available is holistic management, which uses livestock as a substitute for the keystone species such as bison. This allows the rotational mowing to be done by animals which in turn mimics nature more closely. Holistic management also can use fire as a tool, but in a more limited way and in combination with the mowing done by animals.

Prairie contributors 

Some popular prairie restoration projects have been completed and maintained by conservation departments, such as Midewin National Tallgrass Prairie, located in Wilmington, Illinois. This restoration project is administered by the U.S. Department of Agriculture Forest Service and the Illinois Department of Natural Resources. It sits on part of the Joliet Army Ammunition Plant, specifically on an area once contaminated from TNT manufacturing.

Another large restoration project finds its home on the ample area of Fermilab; a U.S. governmental atomic accelerator laboratory located in Batavia, Illinois. This project began in 1971 and continues today with the help of Fermilab employees and many community teachers, botanists and volunteers.

See also
 Buffalo Commons
 Holistic management
 Land rehabilitation
 Restoration ecology

References

External links
 The Prairie Enthusiasts Grassland protection and restoration in the upper Midwest.
 Prairie Plains Resource Institute
 Prairie Parcel Restoration
 Prairies Forever
 Midewin National Tallgrass Prairie
 Fermilab Prairie Prairie at the Fermilab Accelerator at Batavia, IL
 Prairie Restorations, Inc.
 Citizens for Conservation A non-profit centered in Barrington, IL restoring prairie, savanna and wetland habitats.
 Sauk Prairie Conservation Alliance, located in central Wisconsin; instrumental in the rehabilitation of the Sauk Prairie on the Badger Army Ammunition Plant
 International Crane Foundation, restores prairies and other crane habitats.
 Youcanchangetheplanet.org - A non-profit organization dedicated to sustainable conservation and the rehabilitation of prairies, forests, and wetlands.
 American Prairie Foundation - A non-profit organization devoted to creating a prairie-based wildlife reserve in northeastern Montana.
 Missouri Prairie Foundation - A non-profit organization protecting native grasslands throughout the state of Missouri.
 Grand Prairie Friends - A non-profit organization dedicated to preserving and restoring prairies and forests in east-central Illinois, promoting an understanding and appreciation of natural resources.

Prairies
Ecological restoration
Environmental soil science
Environment of the United States